"All Over Me" is a song recorded by Australian rock group, Chocolate Starfish. The song was released in October 1993 as the second single from their self-titled debut studio album (1994).

Track listing
CD Single (874041)
 "All Over Me" - 4:17	
 "On This Day" - 3:51	
 "You're So Vain" - 4:11

Charts

References

1993 songs
Chocolate Starfish songs
1993 singles